Gregorio di Cecco (sometimes Gregorio di Cecco da Lucca or Gregorio da Lucca di Cecco) was an Italian painter of the Sienese School during the early Renaissance. He was born in Siena around 1390 and died after 1424.

He was a student of Taddeo di Bartolo and later became di Bartolo's partner.

Works
Altarpiece (1423) at the Francesco Tolomei chapel at the Siena Cathedral

External links
 The Crucifixion with Saint Francis of Assisi - Saint John the Baptist - Mary Magdalene triptych by Gregorio di Cecco da Lucca

Quattrocento painters
Italian male painters
Painters from Siena
1390s births
15th-century deaths
15th-century Italian painters